The Spy Who Loved Me is a 1977  spy film, the tenth in the James Bond series produced by Eon Productions. It is the third to star Roger Moore as the fictional secret agent James Bond. The film co-stars Barbara Bach and Curt Jürgens and was directed by Lewis Gilbert. The screenplay was by Christopher Wood and Richard Maibaum, with an uncredited rewrite by Tom Mankiewicz.

The film takes its title from Ian Fleming's 1962 novel The Spy Who Loved Me, the tenth book in the James Bond series, though it does not contain any elements of the novel's plot. The storyline involves a reclusive megalomaniac named Karl Stromberg, who plans to destroy the world and create a new civilisation under the sea. Bond teams up with a Soviet agent, Anya Amasova, to stop the plans, all while being hunted by Stromberg’s powerful henchman, Jaws.

It was shot on location in Egypt (Cairo and Luxor) and Italy (Costa Smeralda, Sardinia), with underwater scenes filmed at the Bahamas (Nassau), and a new soundstage built at Pinewood Studios for a massive set which depicted the interior of a supertanker. The Spy Who Loved Me was well received by critics, who saw the film as a return to form for the franchise and praised Moore's performance. Moore himself called the film his personal favourite of his tenure as Bond. The soundtrack composed by Marvin Hamlisch also met with success. The film was nominated for three Academy Awards amid many other nominations and novelised in 1977 by Christopher Wood as James Bond, The Spy Who Loved Me.

Plot
A British and a Soviet ballistic-missile submarine suddenly disappear. James BondMI6 agent 007is summoned to investigate. On the way to his briefing, Bond escapes an ambush by a squad of Soviet agents in Austria, killing one during a downhill ski chase and evading the others. The plans for a highly advanced submarine tracking system are being offered in Egypt. There, Bond encounters Major Anya Amasova – KGB agent Triple X – as a rival for the microfilm plans. They travel across Egypt together, encountering Jawsa tall assassin with razor-sharp steel teethalong the way. Bond and Amasova reluctantly join forces after a truce is agreed by their respective British and Soviet superiors. They uncover evidence linking the plans to shipping tycoon and scientist Karl Stromberg.

While travelling by train to Stromberg's base in Sardinia, Bond saves Amasova from Jaws, and their cooling rivalry turns to affection. Posing as a marine biologist and his wife, they visit Stromberg's base and discover that he had launched a mysterious new supertanker, the Liparus, nine months previously. As they leave the base, a henchman on a motorcycle featuring a rocket sidecar, Jaws in a car, and Naomi, an assistant/pilot of Stromberg in an attack helicopter, chase them, but Bond and Amasova escape underwater when his car – a Lotus Esprit from Q Branch – converts into a submarine. Jaws survives a car crash, and Naomi is killed when Bond fires a sea-air missile from his car which destroys her helicopter. While examining Stromberg's underwater Atlantis base, the pair confirms that he is operating the submarine tracking system and evade an attack by a group of Stromberg's minisubs. Back on land, Bond finds out that the Liparus has never visited any known port or harbour. Amasova discovers that Bond killed her lover Sergei Barsov (as shown at the beginning of the movie), and she vows to kill Bond as soon as their mission is complete.

Bond and Amasova board an American submarine, USS Wayne, to examine the Liparus, but the submarine is captured by the tanker, which is revealed to be a floating submarine dock. Stromberg sets his plan in motion: the simultaneous launching of nuclear missiles from the captured British and Soviet submarines to obliterate Moscow and New York City. This would trigger a global nuclear war, which Stromberg would survive in Atlantis, and subsequently a new civilization would be established underwater. He leaves for Atlantis with Amasova, but Bond escapes and frees the captured British, Russian and American sailors. They battle the Liparus crew and eventually breach the control room, only to learn from the dying captain of the Liparus that the commandeered British and Soviet submarines are primed to fire their missiles in only a few minutes. Bond tricks the submarines into firing the nukes at each other, destroying the subs and Stromberg's crews. The victorious submariners escape the sinking Liparus on the American submarine.

Wayne is ordered by the Pentagon to destroy Atlantis but Bond insists on rescuing Amasova first. He confronts and kills Stromberg but again encounters Jaws, whom he drops into a shark tank. However, Jaws kills the tiger shark and escapes. Bond and Amasova flee in an escape pod as Atlantis is sunk by torpedoes. Amasova picks up Bond's gun and points it at him, but then chooses not to kill him and the two embrace. The Royal Navy recovers the pod and the two spies are seen in an intimate embrace through its port window, to the astonishment of their superiors on the ship.

Cast
Roger Moore as James Bond, British MI6 agent 007, assigned to investigate the theft of two submarines.
 Barbara Bach as Anya Amasova, a Soviet KGB agent XXX, also investigating the theft. Bach was cast only four days before principal photography began, and performed her audition expecting just a supporting role in the film.
 Curt Jürgens as Karl Stromberg, a megalomaniac planning to trigger World War III and destroy the world, then recreate a new civilisation underwater. Jürgens's casting was a suggestion of director Lewis Gilbert, who had worked with him before.

 Richard Kiel as Jaws, Stromberg's seemingly indestructible juggernaut of a henchman, afflicted with gigantism and having a set of metal teeth.
 Caroline Munro as Naomi, Stromberg's personal pilot and a would-be assassin. Munro's casting was inspired by an advertisement campaign she had made. Her voice was dubbed by an uncredited Barbara Jefford, who had previously dubbed Daniela Bianchi in From Russia with Love. 

 Geoffrey Keen as Sir Frederick Gray, the British Minister of Defence. Keen would reprise the role in five more Bond films.
 Edward de Souza as Sheikh Hosein, an Arab sheikh and old friend of Bond; they were students at Cambridge University
 George Baker as Captain Benson, a British naval officer stationed at the Royal Navy's Faslane Naval Base in Scotland.
 Lois Maxwell as Miss Moneypenny, M's secretary.
 Walter Gotell as General Gogol, the head of the KGB and Amasova's boss. Gotell previously played Morzeny in From Russia with Love. Gotell would also reprise this role for five more Bond films.
 Vernon Dobtcheff as Max Kalba, an Egyptian nightclub owner and black market racketeer who possesses the microfilm and tries to encourage Bond and Amasova to bid for it.
 Desmond Llewelyn as Q, MI6's head of research and development. He supplies Bond with unique vehicles and gadgets. Amasova refers to him as Major Boothroyd.
 Michael Billington as Sergei Barsov, Russian agent and Anya Amasova's lover. Billington had previously screentested for the role of Bond.
 Bernard Lee as M, the head of MI6.

 Shane Rimmer as Commander Carter, commanding officer of USS Wayne.
Bryan Marshall as Commander Talbott, commanding officer of HMS Ranger.
Nadim Sawalha as Aziz Fekkesh, a middle-man on the trail of the stolen microfilm.
Robert Brown as Admiral Hargraves, a British Royal Navy official. Brown would later play M in four films.
Sue Vanner as Log Cabin Girl, a Russian agent who sets a trap for 007 in the pre-credit sequence.
Other actors in smaller roles include Sydney Tafler as the Captain of the Liparus, Eva Rueber-Staier as Rubelvitch, General Gogol's secretary; Milton Reid as Sandor, one of Stromberg's thugs; Olga Bisera as Felicca, Fekkesh's glamorous associate; Valerie Leon as the hotel receptionist in Sardinia, Cyril Shaps as Professor Beckmann, Milo Sperber as Dr. Markovitz, Albert Moses as an Egyptian bartender, Marilyn Galsworthy as Stromberg's treacherous secretary.

Nicholas Campbell, Bob Sherman, Murray Salem, John Truscott, Vincent Marzello, Garrick Hagon, Ray Jewers, and George Mallaby appear as USS Wayne crewmen. Barry Andrews, Kevin McNally, Jeremy Bulloch, Sean Bury, David Auker, Keith Buckley, and John Salthouse appear as HMS Ranger crewmen.

The assistant director for the Italian locations, Victor Tourjansky, had a cameo as a man drinking his wine as Bond's Lotus emerges from the beach. As an in-joke, he returned in similar appearances in another two Bond films shot in Italy, Moonraker (the Venice gondola sequence) and For Your Eyes Only (during the ski chase).

Production
Given the relatively poor financial returns and generally unfavourable response of critics to its predecessor, The Man with the Golden Gun (1974), The Spy Who Loved Me was a pivotal film for the Bond franchise. The project was plagued with difficulties from the outset, the first being the departure of Bond producer Harry Saltzman, who was forced to sell his half of the Bond film franchise in 1975 for £20 million. Saltzman had branched out into several other ventures of dubious promise, including an unfilmed biopic about Cuthbert Grant starring Sean Connery, and consequently was struggling through personal financial reversals unrelated to Bond. Saltzman offered his shares in the company as collateral for his loans, and UBS attempted to foreclose on them. When Saltzman's attempted hostile takeover of Technicolor led to a lawsuit, Broccoli refused to allow him to use Danjaq funds, leading to a deadlock in the company as Saltzman refused to allow another Bond film to go forward. This was exacerbated by the twin personal tragedies of his wife's terminal cancer and many of the symptoms of clinical depression in himself.

Under Danjaq's distribution agreement with United Artists, it was required they produce a Bond adaptation every eighteen months or run the risk of losing the rights to the series to United Artists if they did not. However, Saltzman continued blocking production on another Bond film and refused to allow Broccoli to buy his shares. Maurice Binder and Broccoli held negotiations about selling Saltzman's shares to Adnan Khashoggi, David Frost, Lord Hanson, and Lord Harlech. Saltzman finally agreed to sell his shares directly to United Artists so that another Bond film could go forward. Although Broccoli initially objected to the deal, he acquiesced after Saltzman received a counter-offer to sell his rights to the rival studio Columbia Pictures.

Another troubling aspect of the production was the difficulty in obtaining a director. Guy Hamilton, who had directed the previous three Bond films as well as Goldfinger (1964), was initially set to direct. However, in November 1975, he left after being offered the opportunity to direct the 1978 film Superman, although Richard Donner subsequently took over the project. Steven Spielberg, who had finished Jaws (1975) months earlier, approached Broccoli about wanting to direct the next Bond film, but Broccoli declined his offer. By December of that year, Broccoli hired Lewis Gilbert, who had directed the earlier Bond film You Only Live Twice (1967), after screening his then-latest film, Operation Daybreak (1975).

Since Ian Fleming permitted Eon to use only the name of his novel but not the actual plot, Fleming's name was moved for the first time from above the film's title to above "James Bond 007". His name reverted to the traditional location for Moonraker, the last Eon Bond film based on a Fleming novel before 2006's Casino Royale. However, the credit style first used in The Spy Who Loved Me has been used on all Eon Bond films since For Your Eyes Only, including Casino Royale.

Writing
Broccoli commissioned a number of writers to work on the script, including Stirling Silliphant, John Landis, Ronald Hardy, Anthony Burgess, Cary Bates, and Derek Marlowe. The British television producer Gerry Anderson also stated that he provided a film treatment (although originally planned to be Moonraker) very similar to what ended up as The Spy Who Loved Me. Bates's script featured Bond and his former ally Tatiana Romanova teaming up to stop a SPECTRE hijacking of a nuclear submarine coordinated by Hugo Drax from a base underneath Loch Ness. Burgess's draft, featuring characters from his previous novel Tremor of Intent: An Eschatological Spy Novel, featured Bond fighting the criminal organization CHAOS in Singapore and thwarting a plot to assassinate Queen Elizabeth II by a bombing of Sydney Opera House. Andrew Biswell of the International Anthony Burgess Foundation described it as "an outrageous medley of sadism, hypnosis, acupuncture, and international terrorism." Landis, working in the same office as Burgess, wrote a separate screenplay about Bond stopping a kidnapping of the Pope in Latin America.

Eventually, Richard Maibaum provided the initial draft, and at first he tried to incorporate ideas from all of the other writers into his script. Maibaum's original script featured an alliance of international terrorists—including the Red Brigades, the Baader-Meinhof Gang, the Black September Organization, and the Japanese Red Army—attacking SPECTRE's headquarters in Norway and deposing Ernst Stavro Blofeld, before trying to destroy the world with nuclear SLBM attacks on the world's petroleum reservoirs to make way for a New World Order. Maibaum did location scouting in Budapest for the concept. However, this was shelved because Broccoli felt it was too political.

After Gilbert was reinstated as director, he decided to bring in another writer, Christopher Wood. Gilbert also decided to fix what he felt the previous Roger Moore films were doing wrong, which was writing the Bond character too much the way Sean Connery played him, and instead portray Bond closer to the books"very English, very smooth, good sense of humour". Broccoli asked Wood to create a villain with metal teeth, Jaws, inspired by a metal brace-wearing henchman named Sol "Horror" Horowitz, and his short bald accomplice Sandor inspired by Sluggsy Morant in Fleming's novel.

Broccoli agreed to Wood's proposed changes, but before he could set to work there were more legal complications. In the years since Thunderball (1965), Kevin McClory had set up two film companies and had been cleared to produce a rival Bond film after the imposed ten-year moratorium had expired. He was in development of a film project, with the working title Warhead, in collaboration with Sean Connery and novelist Len Deighton. McClory had learned of Broccoli's plans to use SPECTRE, an organisation that had first been created by Fleming while working with McClory and Jack Whittingham on the very first attempt to film Thunderball, back even before it was a novel, in the late 1950s. McClory filed a injunction against Eon Productions alleging copyright infringement. Not wishing to extend the already ongoing legal dispute that could have delayed the production of The Spy Who Loved Me, Broccoli requested Wood remove all references to Blofeld and SPECTRE from the script. In June 1976, McClory was awarded the sole rights to SPECTRE and Blofeld.

Broccoli decided to include the KGB in the film as Bond's allies after showing a group of Russians a James Bond film during the production of The Blue Bird (1976) in the Soviet Union. When they enjoyed the film but commented that it could not be shown there because it was too "anti-Russian," Broccoli decided to include characters such Amasova and Gogol who would be "not a hero, not a villain, but acceptable in terms of Russian distribution."

Tom Mankiewicz, who worked on the three preceding Bond films, claims he was called in to do an extensive rewrite of the script. Mankiewicz says he did not receive credit, because Broccoli was limited to the number of non-British in key positions he could employ on the films to obtain Eady Levy assistance. Vernon Harris also did uncredited rewrites on the script.

Filming

Tom Mankiewicz claims that Catherine Deneuve wanted to play the female lead and was willing to cut her normal rate from $400,000 per picture to $250,000, but Broccoli would not pay above $80,000. Marthe Keller and Dominique Sanda were also considered, while the original frontrunner Lois Chiles was not pursued after her agent informed the producers that she had retired. Before the casting of Richard Kiel, Will Sampson and David Prowse were considered to play Jaws.

The film was shot at the Pinewood Studios in London, Porto Cervo in Sardinia (Hotel Cala di Volpe), Egypt (Karnak, Mosque of Ibn Tulun, Gayer-Anderson Museum, Abu Simbel temples), Malta, Scotland, Hayling Island UK, Okinawa, Switzerland and Mount Asgard on Baffin Island in the then northern Canadian territory of Northwest Territories (now located in Nunavut).

As no studio was big enough for the interior of Stromberg's supertanker, and set designer Ken Adam did not want to repeat what he had done with SPECTRE's volcano base in You Only Live Twice"a workable but ultimately wasteful set"construction began in March 1976 of a new sound stage at Pinewood, the 007 Stage, at a cost of $1.8 million. To complement this stage, Eon also paid for building a water tank capable of storing approximately 1,200,000 gallons (5,500,000 litres). The soundstage was so huge that cinematographer Claude Renoir found himself unable to effectively light it due to his deteriorating eyesight, and so Stanley Kubrick visited the production, in secret, to advise on how to light the stage. For the exterior, while Shell was willing to lend an abandoned tanker to the production, the elevated insurance and safety risks caused it to be replaced with miniatures built by Derek Meddings's team and shot in the Bahamas. Stromberg's shark tank was also filmed in the Bahamas, using a live shark in a saltwater swimming pool. Adam decided to do experiments with curved shapes for the scenery, as he felt all his previous setpieces were "too linear". This was demonstrated with the Atlantis, which is a dome and curved surfaces outside, and many curved objects in Stromberg's office inside. For Gogol's offices, Adam wanted an open space to contrast M's enclosed headquarters, and drew inspiration from Sergei Eisenstein to do a "Russian crypt-like" set.

The main unit began its work in August 1976 in Sardinia. Don McLaughlan, then head of public relations at Lotus Cars, heard that Eon were shopping for a new Bond car. He drove a prototype Lotus Esprit with all Lotus branding taped over, and parked it outside the Eon offices at Pinewood studios; on seeing the car, Eon asked Lotus to borrow both of the prototypes for filming. Initial filming of the car chase sequence resulted in disappointing action sequences. While moving the car between shoots, Lotus test driver Roger Becker so impressed the crew with his handling of the car that for the rest of filming on Sardinia, Becker became the stunt driver.

The motorcycle sidecar missile used in one chase sequence was built by film staff at Pinewood and used a standard Kawasaki Z900 and a custom-made sidecar outfit. The sidecar was made large enough so that a stuntman could lie flat inside. It had two 10-inch scooter wheels on each side, a Suzuki 185 engine, and the detached projectile was steered through a small solid rubber wheel at the front. A heavily smoked perspex nose allowed the stuntman sufficient visibility to steer the device whilst being entirely hidden from view. A pincer-type lock held the sidecar in place until operated by the pilot via a solenoid switch. The sequences involving the outfit were sped up, as the weight of the sidecar made the outfit very difficult to control.

In October, the second unit travelled to Nassau to film the underwater sequences. To create the illusion of the car becoming a submarine, seven different models were used, one for each step of the transformation. One of the models was a fully mobile submarine equipped with an engine built by Miami-based Perry Submarines. The car seen entering the sea was a mock-up shell, propelled off the jetty by a compressed air cannon, whilst the first underwater shot of the car was a miniature model filmed in a test tank. Three full-size bodyshells were used to depict the actual car-to-submersible transition. During the model sequences, the air bubbles seen appearing from the vehicle were created by Alka-Seltzer tablets.

In September, production moved to Egypt. While the Great Sphinx of Giza was shot on location, lighting problems caused the pyramids to be replaced with miniatures. While construction of the Liparus set continued, the second unit (headed by John Glen) departed for Mount Asgard, Baffin Island, where in July 1976 they staged the film's pre-credits sequence. Bond film veteran Willy Bogner captured the action, staged by stuntman Rick Sylvester, who earned $30,000 for the stunt. The scene of Bond skiing off the mountain was inspired by a Canadian Club Whisky advertisement in Playboy magazine of Sylvester performing the same stunt. This stunt cost $500,000 – the most expensive single movie stunt at that time. Additional scenes for the pre-credits sequence were filmed in the Bernina Range in the Swiss alps.

The production team returned briefly to the UK to shoot at the Faslane submarine base before setting off to Spain, Portugal and the Bay of Biscay, where the supertanker exteriors were filmed. On 5 December 1976, with principal photography finished, the 007 Stage was formally opened by former Prime Minister Harold Wilson.

The end credits state "James Bond Will Return in For Your Eyes Only", but following the success of Star Wars, the originally planned For Your Eyes Only was dropped in favour of the space-themed Moonraker for the next film.

Music

The theme song, "Nobody Does It Better", was composed by Marvin Hamlisch, written by Carole Bayer Sager, and performed by Carly Simon. It was the first theme song in the series with a different title to that of the film, although the title is in the lyrics. It was nominated for the Best Song Oscar but lost to "You Light Up My Life".

The song met immediate success and is featured in numerous films, including Mr. & Mrs. Smith (2005), Little Black Book, Lost in Translation, and Bridget Jones: The Edge of Reason (2004). In 2004, it was honoured by the American Film Institute as the 67th greatest song as part of their 100 Years Series.

The soundtrack to the film was composed by Marvin Hamlisch, who filled in for veteran John Barry, who was unavailable to work in the United Kingdom because of tax reasons. The soundtrack, in comparison to other Bond films of the time, is more disco-oriented and included a new disco rendition of the James Bond theme titled "Bond 77"; several pieces of classical music were also included in the score. For instance, while feeding a duplicitous secretary to a shark, Stromberg plays Bach's "Air on the G String", which was famous for accompanying disappointed characters in Hamlet cigar commercials. He then plays the opening string section of the second movement, Andante, of Mozart's Piano Concerto No. 21 as his hideout Atlantis rises from the sea. The score also includes two pieces of popular film music scored by Maurice Jarre. The Doctor Zhivago theme, which is played on Anya's music box during the pre-credit sequence, and the theme from Lawrence of Arabia, which appears as background music during a desert sequence.

Release and reception
On top of the production budget, $7.5 million was spent on advertising, prints and parties for The Spy Who Loved Me. On 20 May 1977, Roger Moore and Barbara Bach attended the Cannes Film Festival to promote the film's upcoming release. It opened with a Royal Premiere attended by Princess Anne at the Odeon Leicester Square in London on 7 July 1977. It grossed $185.4 million worldwide, with $46 million in the United States and Canada. It was United Artist's highest-grossing film at the time. It grossed £10 million in the United Kingdom. On 25 August 2006, the film was re-released at the Empire, Leicester Square for one week. It was again shown at the Empire Leicester Square on 20 April 2008 when Lewis Gilbert attended the first digital screening of the film.

Eon executive Charles Juroe said that at a screening attended by Charles, Prince of Wales, during the Union Jack-parachute scene: "I have never seen a reaction in the cinema as there was that night. You couldn't help it. You could not help but stand up. Even Prince Charles stood up." This scene came in second place in a 2013 Sky Movies poll for greatest moment of the James Bond film franchise, beaten only by the "No, Mr. Bond, I expect you to die!" sequence from Goldfinger. It was Roger Moore's favourite Bond film, and many reviewers consider it the best instalment to star the actor.

Contemporary reviews 
Janet Maslin of The New York Times considered the film formulaic and "half an hour too long, thanks to the obligatory shoot-'em-up conclusion, ... nevertheless the dullest sequence here" but praised Moore's performance and the film's "share of self-mockery", which she found refreshing. Charles Champlin of the Los Angeles Times felt "The Spy Who Loved Me is an extravagant silliness, a high-cost undertaking in let's pretend which delivers a perfect formula. It may not be everyone's tonic, but it is what it says it is, rousingly." Gene Siskel of The Chicago Tribune praised the ski jump stunt in which he wrote that "you begin to think Spy may turn out to be as good as From Russia with Love, the best Bond of all. No such luck. True, opening pace of Spy is impossible to sustain, but the rest of the picture is merely good, not great." He also found Stromberg to be less memorable than previous Bond villains, even noting that "Jaws is far more entertaining than his master." Variety remarked the film "is unoriginal and mild on suspense as these capers go. But the gimmick-laden action is bountiful and eye-ravishing, and will compensate most audiences."

Christopher Porterfield, reviewing for Time magazine, was complimentary of the pre-titles sequence and Richard Kiel's performance as Jaws. However, he criticised the film for being too similar to previous instalments, remarking "[a]ll that's left of Bond formula here is 007 character, sexy starlets and gee-whiz gadgets. (Question: What else did it ever consist of?)" Similarly, Maureen Orth of Newsweek wrote: "After the opening sequence, much of the action in The Spy Who Loved Me, the tenth James Bond screen epic and the third starring Roger Moore as Bond, is somewhat downhill. But the film, shot in seven countries, is so rich in fantasy, so filled with beautiful scenery, gorgeous women, preposterous villains and impossible situations that's it easier to suspend disbelief entirely and escape inside the gadgetry and glamour."

John Simon, writing in his book Reverse Angle, stated "There is a kind of film that can get away with everything, and deserves to. The latest James Bond, Spy Who Loved Me, belongs in that class." Gary Arnold of The Washington Post dismissed the film as "a tolerable disappointment. The Bond movies have been so successful that it may be commercially impossible to terminate the series. However, it's been quite a while since a Bond adventure appeared to set fashions in escapist, glamorous entertainment. Once widely imitated and parodied by other producers, Bond films are now more likely to imitate themselves with decreasing effectiveness."

Retrospective reviews 
On the website FilmCritic.com, Christopher Null awarded the film  stars out of 5, in which he praised the gadgets, particularly the Lotus Esprit car. James Berardinelli of Reelviews wrote that the film is "suave and sophisticated", and Barbara Bach proves to be an ideal Bond girl – "attractive, smart, sexy, and dangerous". Brian Webster stated the special effects were "good for a 1979 [sic] film", and Marvin Hamlisch's music, "memorable". Danny Peary described The Spy Who Loved Me as "exceptional ... For once, the big budget was not wasted. Interestingly, while the sets and gimmicks were the most spectacular to date, Bond and the other characters are toned down (there's a minimum of slapstick humour) so that they are more realistic than in other Roger Moore films. Moore gives his best performance in the series ... [Bond and Anya Amasova] are an appealing couple, equal in every way. Film is a real treat – a well acted, smartly cast, sexy, visually impressive, lavishly produced, powerfully directed mix of a spy romance and a war-mission film."

The Times placed Jaws and Stromberg as the sixth and seventh best Bond villains (respectively) in the series in 2008, and also named the Esprit as the second best car in the series (behind the Aston Martin DB5). On the review aggregation website Rotten Tomatoes, the film has an approval rating of 81% based on 57 reviews with an average rating of 7.20/10. The website's critical consensus reads: "Though it hints at the absurdity to come in later installments, The Spy Who Loved Me's sleek style, menacing villains, and sly wit make it the best of the Roger Moore era." On Metacritic, the film has a weighted average score of 55 based on 12 reviews, indicating "mixed or average reviews".

Accolades

 Golden Screen, awarded by the German film industry.
 Writers Guild of America WGA Award: Nominee for Best Comedy Adapted to Another Medium: Christopher Wood and Richard Maibaum.
 2 nominations for the Saturn Award granted by the United States Science Fiction, Fantasy and Horror Film Academy.
Roger Moore for Best Actor.
Richard Kiel for Best Supporting Actor.

Novelisation

When Ian Fleming sold the film rights to the James Bond novels to Harry Saltzman and Albert R. Broccoli, he gave permission only for the title The Spy Who Loved Me to be used. Since the screenplay for the film had nothing to do with Fleming's original novel, Eon Productions, for the first time, authorised a novelisation based upon the script. This would also be the first regular Bond novel published since Colonel Sun nearly a decade earlier. Christopher Wood, who co-authored the screenplay, was commissioned to write the book titled James Bond, The Spy Who Loved Me.

The novelisation and the screenplay, although both written by Wood, are somewhat different. In the novelisation, SMERSH is still active and after James Bond. Their role begins during the pre-title. After the mysterious death of Fekkish, SMERSH appears yet again, this time capturing and torturing Bond for the whereabouts of the microfilm that retains plans for a submarine tracking system (Bond escapes after killing two of the interrogators). The appearance of SMERSH conflicts with a number of Bond stories, including the film The Living Daylights (1987), in which General Leonid Pushkin remarks that SMERSH has been defunct for over 20 years. It also differs from the latter half of Fleming's Bond novels in which SMERSH is said to have been put out of operation. Members of SMERSH from the novelisation include Amasova and her lover Sergei Barsov as well as Colonel-General Nikitin, a character from Fleming's novel From Russia, with Love who has since become the head of SMERSH. In the book, Jaws remains attached to the magnet that Bond dips into the tank, as opposed to the film where Bond releases Jaws into the water.

There are also a number of elements that are either underplayed for more plausibility (the Lotus does not have any gadgets on land, unlike the film version) or are expanded to give more background to the characters (Jaws has a full history, Nikitin is in lust with Amasova, Stromberg’s name is Sigmond and is tall, bald and has a small fleshy growth on one finger - unlike the webbed fingered Karl Stromberg of the film).
Neither the characters of Q or Miss Moneypenny appear in the novelisation.
The henchmen who falls off the roof in Cairo is killed when he lands on top of a piano, a death Wood reused in the script for his next Bond film, Moonraker.

Sale of props
The Lotus Esprit, also known as Wet Nellie, capable of transforming from car to submarine in the film, was purchased for £616,000 at a London auction in October 2013 by Elon Musk, who planned to rebuild the vehicle and attempt to make the fictional dual-purpose car be an actual dual-purpose car (underwater and on land).

See also

 James Bond 007: Nightfire, a 2002 video game featuring the Liparus and Atlantis settings from this film, which also includes a submarine-car not unlike the Lotus Esprit.
 "Our Man Bashir", a 1995 episode of the television series Star Trek: Deep Space Nine was largely based on this film.
 Outline of James Bond
 Rinspeed sQuba, a submersible car inspired by the film.
 Wet Nellie – a custom-built submarine created for the movie in the shape of a Lotus Esprit S1 sports car.

References

Sources

External links

 
 
 
 
 
 

 
1970s action thriller films
1970s spy films
1977 films
British sequel films
Cold War spy films
Cold War submarine films
1970s English-language films
Films about nuclear war and weapons
British films about revenge
Films directed by Lewis Gilbert
Films produced by Albert R. Broccoli
Films scored by Marvin Hamlisch
Films set in Austria
Films set in Cairo
Films set in Egypt
Films set in Sardinia
Films set in London
Films set in the Atlantic Ocean
Films set in the Mediterranean Sea
Films set in the Soviet Union
Films shot at Pinewood Studios
Films shot in the Bahamas
Films shot in Egypt
Films shot in Okinawa Prefecture
Films shot in Malta
Films shot in Sardinia
Films shot in Scotland
Films shot in Switzerland
Films shot in the Northwest Territories
James Bond films
Metro-Goldwyn-Mayer films
Films with screenplays by Richard Maibaum
Films with screenplays by Christopher Wood (writer)
Skiing films
Underwater action films
Underwater civilizations in fiction
United Artists films
Eon Productions films
1970s British films